XEDA-AM was an AM radio station in Mexico City, Mexico. It began operations on December 3, 1936, and it was the flagship station of Radio S.A., with a news and talk format.

History
The first concession for XEDA was awarded to Augusto García Díaz, for a station on 680 kHz. Not long after it moved to its current 1290 kHz frequency.
 
In 1953, the station was bought by Publicistas, S.A., the business of Guillermo Morales Blumenkron, which also obtained a concession for XEDA-FM (now separately owned). The concessionaire was not changed for another 59 years, but in the mid-1990s, XEDA-AM and XEDA-FM were split off. At the time, 1290 AM had a rock music format.

While Radio Trece programming continues online, the AM radio station was turned off on May 31, 2015. Radio S.A. cited the unprofitability of AM radio in its decision. Radio S.A. also cited a lack of official advertising budget for AM radio stations in Mexico City, the unavailability of the AM band on newer radios, and poor sound quality, in its decision; it noted that it had to lay off 150 people "for being obligated to operate with obsolete technology". XEDA's concession was not renewed and expired on July 3, 2016.

External links 
 XEDA-AM 1290 kHz, Radio Trece official page

References 

Radio stations in Mexico City
Defunct radio stations in Mexico
Radio stations established in 1936
Radio stations disestablished in 2015